Kinský is a Czech surname. Notable people with the surname include:

Antonín Kinský (born 1975), Czech footballer
Jindřich Kinský (born 1927), Czech basketball player
Vilém Kinský (1574–1634), Czech count and statesman

See also 
 Kinsky

Czech-language surnames